Anthony Garry Anselmo,  (March 14, 1918 – November 10, 2009) was a community builder for the Calgary Stampeders Football Club of the Canadian Football League and was involved with the team from 1973 until 2009.

In 1978, he was made a Member of the Order of Canada "in recognition of his numerous services to Calgary". He was inducted into the Canadian Football Hall of Fame as a builder in 2009.

References

External links
 Canadian Football Hall of Fame official website
 Obituary

Businesspeople from Calgary
Members of the Order of Canada
1918 births
2009 deaths
Canadian Football Hall of Fame inductees